The following lists events that happened in 1924 in Iceland.

Incumbents
Monarch – Kristján X
Prime Minister – Sigurður Eggerz, Jón Magnússon

Events
22 March – Third cabinet of Jón Magnússon formed
1924 Úrvalsdeild

Births

28 January – Karl Guðmundsson, footballer (d. 2012)
10 April – Jónas Kristjánsson, scholar and novelist (d. 2014)
25 May – Finnbjörn Þorvaldsson, sprinter. (d. 2018)
4 July – Sveinbjörn Beinteinsson (d. 1993)
7 July – Benedikt Sigurðsson Gröndal, politician (d. 2010)
14 July – Matthías Kristjánsson, cross country skier (d. 1998).
14 November – Sveinn Helgason, footballer

Deaths

31 December – Jón Thoroddsen junior, writer (b. 1898)
26 July – Muggur, or Guðmundur Pétursson Thorsteinsson, artist and film actor (b. 1891)

References

 
1920s in Iceland
Iceland
Iceland
Years of the 20th century in Iceland